Semecarpus is a genus of plants in the family Anacardiaceae.

Taxonomy
The genus Semecarpus was erected by Carl Linnaeus the Younger in 1782 in Supplementum Plantarum. In the same work, he described Semecarpus anacardium. The gender of the genus name has been the subject of some confusion. Early authors treated it as feminine. As one example, in 1850, Carl Ludwig Blume described a number of species of Semecarpus, such as Semecarpus heterophylla and Semecarpus longifolia, using feminine endings for the specific epithet. However, Example 3 of Article 62 of the International Code of Nomenclature for algae, fungi, and plants states that all compounds ending in the Greek masculine ‑carpos or ‑carpus are masculine. , the International Plant Names Index and Plants of the World Online used masculine endings, such as Semecarpus heterophyllus and Semecarpus longifolius, while the Global Biodiversity Information Facility had mixed endings, such as Semecarpus heterophylla and Semecarpus longifolius.

Species
, Plants of the World Online accepted the following species:

 Semecarpus acuminatus  (orth. var. Semecarpus acuminata)
 Semecarpus albicans 
 Semecarpus anacardiopsis 
 Semecarpus anacardium 
 Semecarpus angulatus 
 Semecarpus angustifolius 
 Semecarpus annamensis 
 Semecarpus aruensis 
 Semecarpus ater 
 Semecarpus auriculatus  (orth. var. Semecarpus auriculata)
 Semecarpus australiensis 
 Semecarpus balansae 
 Semecarpus borneensis 
 Semecarpus brachystachys 
 Semecarpus bracteatus 
 Semecarpus bunburyanus 
 Semecarpus calcicola 
 Semecarpus cassuvium 
 Semecarpus caudatus 
 Semecarpus cochinchinensis 
 Semecarpus coriaceus  (orth. var. Semecarpus coriacea)
 Semecarpus cuneiformis 
 Semecarpus cupularis 
 Semecarpus curtisii 
 Semecarpus decipiens 
 Semecarpus densiflorus 
 Semecarpus euodiifolius 
 Semecarpus forstenii 
 Semecarpus gardneri 
 Semecarpus glauciphyllus 
 Semecarpus graciliflorus 
 Semecarpus heterophyllus 
 Semecarpus humilis 
 Semecarpus impressicostatus 
 Semecarpus insularum 
 Semecarpus kathalekanensis 
 Semecarpus kinabaluensis 
 Semecarpus kraemeri 
 Semecarpus kurzii 
 Semecarpus lamii 
 Semecarpus lineatus 
 Semecarpus longifolius 
 Semecarpus longipes 
 Semecarpus lucens 
 Semecarpus macrophyllus 
 Semecarpus magnificus 
 Semecarpus marginatus 
 Semecarpus microcarpus 
 Semecarpus minutipetalus 
 Semecarpus moonii 
 Semecarpus myriocarpus 
 Semecarpus neocaledonicus 
 Semecarpus nidificans 
 Semecarpus nigroviridis 
 Semecarpus obovatus  (orth. var. Semecarpus obovata)
 Semecarpus ochraceus  (orth. var. Semecarpus ochracea)
 Semecarpus panduratus 
 Semecarpus papuanus 
 Semecarpus parvifolius  (orth. var. Semecarpus parvifolia)
 Semecarpus paucinervius 
 Semecarpus perniciosus 
 Semecarpus poyaensis 
 Semecarpus prainii 
 Semecarpus pseudoemarginatus  (orth. var. Semecarpus pseudo-emarginata)
 Semecarpus pubescens 
 Semecarpus pulvinatus 
 Semecarpus reticulatus 
 Semecarpus riparius  (orth. var. Semecarpus riparia)
 Semecarpus rostratus 
 Semecarpus rufovelutinus 
 Semecarpus sandakanus 
 Semecarpus schlechteri 
 Semecarpus stenophyllus 
 Semecarpus subpanduriformis 
 Semecarpus subpeltatus  (orth. var. Semecarpus subpeltata)
 Semecarpus subracemosus 
 Semecarpus subspathulatus 
 Semecarpus tannaensis 
 Semecarpus tonkinensis 
 Semecarpus trachyphyllus 
 Semecarpus travancoricus  (orth. var. Semecarpus travancorica)
 Semecarpus trengganuensis 
 Semecarpus velutinus 
 Semecarpus venenosus 
 Semecarpus virotii 
 Semecarpus vitiensis 
 Semecarpus walkeri

References

External links

 
Taxonomy articles created by Polbot
Anacardiaceae genera